Bytt är bytt is a Swedish antiques show broadcast on TV4. The first season started airing on 27 September 2014. The show is presented by Renée Nyberg and the antiques expert is Karin Laserow. The show is a Swedish TV-concept.

References

TV4 (Sweden) original programming